Aiga Zagorska (born 28 March 1970) is a retired female track and road racing cyclist from Latvia, who competed at the 1992 Summer Olympics in Barcelona, Spain for Lithuania. She finished in 14th place in the women's individual road race.

References

External links
 
 
 

1970 births
Living people
Soviet female cyclists
Lithuanian female cyclists
Lithuanian track cyclists
Cyclists at the 1992 Summer Olympics
Olympic cyclists of Lithuania
People from Tukums